Jack Lynn may refer to:
Jack Lynn (architect), British architect
Jack Lynn (American football), American football linebacker
Jack Lynn (soccer), American soccer player
Elwyn Lynn, known as Jack, Australian artist